Sinobambusa is a genus of East Asian bamboo in the grass family. It is native to China and Vietnam. Sinobambusa tootsik also occurs in Japan, having been introduced there during the Tang Dynasty (618–907).

Species
 Sinobambusa baccanensis T.Q.Nguyen – Vietnam
 Sinobambusa farinosa (McClure) T.H.Wen – Fujian, Guangdong, Guangxi, Jiangxi, Zhejiang
 Sinobambusa henryi (McClure) C.D.Chu & C.S.Chao – Guangdong, Guangxi
 Sinobambusa humila McClure – Guangdong
 Sinobambusa incana T.H.Wen – Guangdong
 Sinobambusa intermedia McClure – Fujian, Guangdong, Guangxi, Sichuan, Yunnan
 Sinobambusa nephroaurita C.D.Chu & C.S.Chao – Guangdong, Guangxi, Sichuan
 Sinobambusa rubroligula McClure – Guangdong, Guangxi, Hainan
 Sinobambusa sat (Balansa) C.S.Chao & Renvoize – Vietnam
 Sinobambusa scabrida T.H.Wen – Guangxi
 Sinobambusa solearis (McClure) T.Q.Nguyen – Vietnam
 Sinobambusa tootsik (Makino) Makino ex Nakai – Fujian, Guangdong, Guangxi, Vietnam; naturalized in Japan including Ryukyu Islands
 Sinobambusa yixingensis C.S.Chao & K.S.Xiao – Jiangsu

Formerly included
see Acidosasa Chimonobambusa Gelidocalamus Indosasa Oligostachyum Phyllostachys Pleioblastus Pseudosasa Yushania

References

Bambusoideae
Bambusoideae genera
Flora of China
Flora of Vietnam